Eupithecia bastelbergeri is a moth in the family Geometridae. It is found in Kazakhstan, Kyrghyzstan, Russia, Iran and Turkey.

Subspecies
Eupithecia bastelbergeri bastelbergeri
Eupithecia bastelbergeri korvaci Prout, 1938 (Turkey)

References

Moths described in 1910
bastelbergeri
Moths of Asia